Brian Scrimgeour (born 11 August 1959) is a Scottish former professional footballer, who played in The Football League, as a defender.

References

1959 births
Living people
Footballers from Dundee
Association football defenders
Dundee F.C. players
Chesterfield F.C. players
Falkirk F.C. players
Partick Thistle F.C. players
Scottish Football League players
English Football League players
Dundee Violet F.C. players
Scottish footballers